The ATP Challenger Tour, in 2015 was the secondary professional tennis circuit organized by the ATP. The 2015 ATP Challenger Tour calendar comprised 166 tournaments, with prize money ranging from $40,000 up to $220,000. It was the 38th edition of challenger tournaments cycle, and 7th under the name of Challenger Tour.

Schedule 
This is the complete schedule of events on the 2015 calendar, with player progression documented from the quarterfinals stage.

January

February

March

April

May

June

July

August

September

October

November

Statistical information 
These tables present the number of singles (S) and doubles (D) titles won by each player and each nation during the season. The players/nations are sorted by:
 Total number of titles (a doubles title won by two players representing the same nation counts as only one win for the nation); 
 A singles > doubles hierarchy;
 Alphabetical order (by family names for players).

Titles won by player 
{| class="sortable wikitable" style="font-size:90%;"
|-
!width=81 |Total
!width=236 |Player
!width=47 style="background:#FFFFFF"| S 
!width=47 style="background:#FFFFFF"| D 
!width=47 style="background:#efefef"| S 
!width=47 style="background:#efefef"| D 
|- align=center
|bgcolor=#efefef |9 ||align=left| ||  ||||bgcolor=#efefef|0 || bgcolor=#efefef|9
|- align=center
|bgcolor=#efefef |8 ||align=left| ||  ||||bgcolor=#efefef|2 || bgcolor=#efefef|6
|- align=center
|bgcolor=#efefef |8 ||align=left| ||  ||||bgcolor=#efefef|0 || bgcolor=#efefef|8
|- align=center
|bgcolor=#efefef |8 ||align=left| ||  ||||bgcolor=#efefef|0 || bgcolor=#efefef|8
|- align=center
|bgcolor=#efefef |8 ||align=left| ||  ||||bgcolor=#efefef|0 || bgcolor=#efefef|8 
|- align=center
|bgcolor=#efefef |7 ||align=left| ||  ||||bgcolor=#efefef|0 || bgcolor=#efefef|7
|- align=center
|bgcolor=#efefef |7 ||align=left| ||  ||||bgcolor=#efefef|0 || bgcolor=#efefef|7 
|- align=center
|bgcolor=#efefef |6 ||align=left| || ||||bgcolor=#efefef|4 || bgcolor=#efefef|2
|- align=center
|bgcolor=#efefef |6 ||align=left| ||  ||||bgcolor=#efefef|0 || bgcolor=#efefef|6
|- align=center
|bgcolor=#efefef |6 ||align=left| ||  ||||bgcolor=#efefef|0 || bgcolor=#efefef|6
|- align=center
|bgcolor=#efefef |5 ||align=left| ||   || || bgcolor=#efefef|4 || bgcolor=#efefef|1
|- align=center
|bgcolor=#efefef |5 ||align=left| ||  ||  || bgcolor=#efefef|4 || bgcolor=#efefef|1
|- align=center
|bgcolor=#efefef |5 ||align=left| ||  ||||bgcolor=#efefef|3 || bgcolor=#efefef|2
|- align=center
|bgcolor=#efefef |5 ||align=left| ||  ||||bgcolor=#efefef|2 || bgcolor=#efefef|3
|- align=center
|bgcolor=#efefef |5 ||align=left| ||  ||  || bgcolor=#efefef|1 || bgcolor=#efefef|4
|- align=center
|bgcolor=#efefef |5 ||align=left| ||  ||||bgcolor=#efefef|0 || bgcolor=#efefef|5
|- align=center
|bgcolor=#efefef |5 ||align=left| ||  || ● ||bgcolor=#efefef|0 || bgcolor=#efefef|5
|- align=center
|bgcolor=#efefef |5 ||align=left| ||  ||||bgcolor=#efefef|0 || bgcolor=#efefef|5
|- align=center
|bgcolor=#efefef |4 ||align=left| ||   || || bgcolor=#efefef|4 || bgcolor=#efefef|0
|- align=center
|bgcolor=#efefef |4 ||align=left| ||  ||  || bgcolor=#efefef|3 || bgcolor=#efefef|1
|- align=center
|bgcolor=#efefef |4 ||align=left| ||  || ||bgcolor=#efefef|2 || bgcolor=#efefef|2
|- align=center
|bgcolor=#efefef |4 ||align=left| ||   ||   || bgcolor=#efefef|2 || bgcolor=#efefef|2
|- align=center
|bgcolor=#efefef |4 ||align=left| ||  ||  ||bgcolor=#efefef|2 || bgcolor=#efefef|2
|- align=center
|bgcolor=#efefef |4 ||align=left| || ||||bgcolor=#efefef|1 || bgcolor=#efefef|3
|- align=center
|bgcolor=#efefef |4 ||align=left| ||   ||  || bgcolor=#efefef|1 || bgcolor=#efefef|3
|- align=center
|bgcolor=#efefef |4 ||align=left| ||  || ||bgcolor=#efefef|0 || bgcolor=#efefef|4
|- align=center
|bgcolor=#efefef |4 ||align=left| ||  ||||bgcolor=#efefef|0 || bgcolor=#efefef|4
|- align=center
|bgcolor=#efefef |4 ||align=left| ||  ||||bgcolor=#efefef|0 || bgcolor=#efefef|4
|- align=center
|bgcolor=#efefef |4 ||align=left| ||  ||||bgcolor=#efefef|0 || bgcolor=#efefef|4
|- align=center
|bgcolor=#efefef |4 ||align=left| ||  ||||bgcolor=#efefef|0 || bgcolor=#efefef|4
|- align=center
|bgcolor=#efefef |4 ||align=left| ||  ||||bgcolor=#efefef|0 || bgcolor=#efefef|4
|- align=center
|bgcolor=#efefef |3 ||align=left| ||   || || bgcolor=#efefef|3 || bgcolor=#efefef|0
|- align=center
|bgcolor=#efefef |3 ||align=left| ||  || || bgcolor=#efefef|3 || bgcolor=#efefef|0
|- align=center
|bgcolor=#efefef |3 ||align=left| ||   || || bgcolor=#efefef|3 || bgcolor=#efefef|0
|- align=center
|bgcolor=#efefef |3 ||align=left| ||   || || bgcolor=#efefef|3 || bgcolor=#efefef|0
|- align=center
|bgcolor=#efefef |3 ||align=left| ||   || || bgcolor=#efefef|3 || bgcolor=#efefef|0
|- align=center
|bgcolor=#efefef |3 ||align=left| ||  ● ●|| || bgcolor=#efefef|3 || bgcolor=#efefef|0
|- align=center
|bgcolor=#efefef |3 ||align=left| ||   || || bgcolor=#efefef|3 || bgcolor=#efefef|0
|- align=center
|bgcolor=#efefef |3 ||align=left| ||   || || bgcolor=#efefef|3 || bgcolor=#efefef|0
|- align=center
|bgcolor=#efefef |3 ||align=left| ||   || || bgcolor=#efefef|3 || bgcolor=#efefef|0
|- align=center
|bgcolor=#efefef |3 ||align=left| ||  ||||bgcolor=#efefef|2 || bgcolor=#efefef|1
|- align=center
|bgcolor=#efefef |3 ||align=left| ||  ||||bgcolor=#efefef|2 || bgcolor=#efefef|1
|- align=center
|bgcolor=#efefef |3 ||align=left| ||   || || bgcolor=#efefef|2 || bgcolor=#efefef|1
|- align=center
|bgcolor=#efefef |3 ||align=left| ||  ||||bgcolor=#efefef|2 || bgcolor=#efefef|1
|- align=center
|bgcolor=#efefef |3 ||align=left| ||   ||||bgcolor=#efefef|2 || bgcolor=#efefef|1
|- align=center
|bgcolor=#efefef |3 ||align=left| ||  ||||bgcolor=#efefef|2 || bgcolor=#efefef|1
|- align=center
|bgcolor=#efefef |3 ||align=left| ||  ||||bgcolor=#efefef|2 || bgcolor=#efefef|1
|- align=center
|bgcolor=#efefef |3 ||align=left| ||  ||  || bgcolor=#efefef|2 || bgcolor=#efefef|1
|- align=center
|bgcolor=#efefef |3 ||align=left| ||  ||  || bgcolor=#efefef|1 || bgcolor=#efefef|2
|- align=center
|bgcolor=#efefef |3 ||align=left| ||  || || bgcolor=#efefef|1 || bgcolor=#efefef|2
|- align=center
|bgcolor=#efefef |3 ||align=left| ||   ||||bgcolor=#efefef|1 || bgcolor=#efefef|2
|- align=center
|bgcolor=#efefef |3 ||align=left| || ||||bgcolor=#efefef|1 || bgcolor=#efefef|2
|- align=center
|bgcolor=#efefef |3 ||align=left| ||  ||||bgcolor=#efefef|0 || bgcolor=#efefef|3
|- align=center
|bgcolor=#efefef |3 ||align=left| ||  ||||bgcolor=#efefef|0 || bgcolor=#efefef|3
|- align=center
|bgcolor=#efefef |3 ||align=left| ||  ||||bgcolor=#efefef|0 || bgcolor=#efefef|3
|- align=center
|bgcolor=#efefef |3 ||align=left| ||  ||||bgcolor=#efefef|0 || bgcolor=#efefef|3
|- align=center
|bgcolor=#efefef |3 ||align=left| ||  ||||bgcolor=#efefef|0 || bgcolor=#efefef|3
|- align=center
|bgcolor=#efefef |3 ||align=left| ||  ||||bgcolor=#efefef|0 || bgcolor=#efefef|3
|- align=center
|bgcolor=#efefef |3 ||align=left| ||  ||||bgcolor=#efefef|0 || bgcolor=#efefef|3
|- align=center
|bgcolor=#efefef |3 ||align=left| ||  ||||bgcolor=#efefef|0 || bgcolor=#efefef|3
|- align=center
|bgcolor=#efefef |3 ||align=left| ||  ||||bgcolor=#efefef|0 || bgcolor=#efefef|3
|- align=center
|bgcolor=#efefef |3 ||align=left| ||  ||||bgcolor=#efefef|0 || bgcolor=#efefef|3
|- align=center
|bgcolor=#efefef |2 ||align=left| ||   || || bgcolor=#efefef|2 || bgcolor=#efefef|0
|- align=center
|bgcolor=#efefef |2 ||align=left| ||  ||||bgcolor=#efefef|2 || bgcolor=#efefef|0
|- align=center
|bgcolor=#efefef |2 ||align=left| ||   || || bgcolor=#efefef|2 || bgcolor=#efefef|0
|- align=center
|bgcolor=#efefef |2 ||align=left| ||   || || bgcolor=#efefef|2 || bgcolor=#efefef|0
|- align=center
|bgcolor=#efefef |2 ||align=left| ||   || || bgcolor=#efefef|2 || bgcolor=#efefef|0
|- align=center
|bgcolor=#efefef |2 ||align=left| ||   || || bgcolor=#efefef|2 || bgcolor=#efefef|0
|- align=center
|bgcolor=#efefef |2 ||align=left| ||  || || bgcolor=#efefef|2 || bgcolor=#efefef|0
|- align=center
|bgcolor=#efefef |2 ||align=left| ||   || || bgcolor=#efefef|2 || bgcolor=#efefef|0
|- align=center
|bgcolor=#efefef |2 ||align=left| ||   || || bgcolor=#efefef|2 || bgcolor=#efefef|0
|- align=center
|bgcolor=#efefef |2 ||align=left| ||   || || bgcolor=#efefef|2 || bgcolor=#efefef|0
|- align=center
|bgcolor=#efefef |2 ||align=left| ||  || || bgcolor=#efefef|2 || bgcolor=#efefef|0
|- align=center
|bgcolor=#efefef |2 ||align=left| ||  ||||bgcolor=#efefef|1 || bgcolor=#efefef|1
|- align=center
|bgcolor=#efefef |2 ||align=left| ||  || || bgcolor=#efefef|1 || bgcolor=#efefef|1
|- align=center
|bgcolor=#efefef |2 ||align=left| ||   ||||bgcolor=#efefef|1 || bgcolor=#efefef|1
|- align=center
|bgcolor=#efefef |2 ||align=left| ||   ||  || bgcolor=#efefef|1 || bgcolor=#efefef|1
|- align=center
|bgcolor=#efefef |2 ||align=left| ||  ||  || bgcolor=#efefef|1 || bgcolor=#efefef|1
|- align=center
|bgcolor=#efefef |2 ||align=left| ||   || || bgcolor=#efefef|1 || bgcolor=#efefef|1
|- align=center
|bgcolor=#efefef |2 ||align=left| ||  ||||bgcolor=#efefef|1 || bgcolor=#efefef|1
|- align=center
|bgcolor=#efefef |2 ||align=left| ||  ||  || bgcolor=#efefef|1 || bgcolor=#efefef|1
|- align=center
|bgcolor=#efefef |2 ||align=left| ||  ||||bgcolor=#efefef|1 || bgcolor=#efefef|1
|- align=center
|bgcolor=#efefef |2 ||align=left| ||  ||||bgcolor=#efefef|1 || bgcolor=#efefef|1
|- align=center
|bgcolor=#efefef |2 ||align=left| ||  ||||bgcolor=#efefef|1 || bgcolor=#efefef|1
|- align=center
|bgcolor=#efefef |2 ||align=left| ||  ||||bgcolor=#efefef|0 || bgcolor=#efefef|2
|- align=center
|bgcolor=#efefef |2 ||align=left| ||  ||||bgcolor=#efefef|0 || bgcolor=#efefef|2
|- align=center
|bgcolor=#efefef |2 ||align=left| ||  ||||bgcolor=#efefef|0 || bgcolor=#efefef|2
|- align=center
|bgcolor=#efefef |2 ||align=left| ||  ||||bgcolor=#efefef|0 || bgcolor=#efefef|2
|- align=center
|bgcolor=#efefef |2 ||align=left| ||  ||||bgcolor=#efefef|0 || bgcolor=#efefef|2
|- align=center
|bgcolor=#efefef |2 ||align=left| ||  ||||bgcolor=#efefef|0 || bgcolor=#efefef|2
|- align=center
|bgcolor=#efefef |2 ||align=left| ||  ||||bgcolor=#efefef|0 || bgcolor=#efefef|2
|- align=center
|bgcolor=#efefef |2 ||align=left| ||  ||||bgcolor=#efefef|0 || bgcolor=#efefef|2 
|- align=center
|bgcolor=#efefef |2 ||align=left| ||  ||||bgcolor=#efefef|0 || bgcolor=#efefef|2
|- align=center
|bgcolor=#efefef |2 ||align=left| ||  ||||bgcolor=#efefef|0 || bgcolor=#efefef|2
|- align=center
|bgcolor=#efefef |2 ||align=left| ||  ||||bgcolor=#efefef|0 || bgcolor=#efefef|2
|- align=center
|bgcolor=#efefef |2 ||align=left| ||  ||||bgcolor=#efefef|0 || bgcolor=#efefef|2
|- align=center
|bgcolor=#efefef |2 ||align=left| ||  ||||bgcolor=#efefef|0 || bgcolor=#efefef|2
|- align=center
|bgcolor=#efefef |2 ||align=left| ||  ||||bgcolor=#efefef|0 || bgcolor=#efefef|2
|- align=center
|bgcolor=#efefef |2 ||align=left| ||  ||||bgcolor=#efefef|0 || bgcolor=#efefef|2
|- align=center
|bgcolor=#efefef |2 ||align=left| ||  ||||bgcolor=#efefef|0 || bgcolor=#efefef|2
|- align=center
|bgcolor=#efefef |2 ||align=left| ||  ||||bgcolor=#efefef|0 || bgcolor=#efefef|2
|- align=center
|bgcolor=#efefef |2 ||align=left| ||  ||||bgcolor=#efefef|0 || bgcolor=#efefef|2
|- align=center
|bgcolor=#efefef |2 ||align=left| ||  ||||bgcolor=#efefef|0 || bgcolor=#efefef|2
|- align=center
|bgcolor=#efefef |2 ||align=left| ||  ||||bgcolor=#efefef|0 || bgcolor=#efefef|2
|- align=center
|bgcolor=#efefef |2 ||align=left| ||  ||||bgcolor=#efefef|0 || bgcolor=#efefef|2
|- align=center
|bgcolor=#efefef |2 ||align=left| ||  ||||bgcolor=#efefef|0 || bgcolor=#efefef|2
|- align=center
|bgcolor=#efefef |2 ||align=left| ||  ||||bgcolor=#efefef|0 || bgcolor=#efefef|2
|- align=center
|bgcolor=#efefef |2 ||align=left| ||  ||||bgcolor=#efefef|0 || bgcolor=#efefef|2
|- align=center
|bgcolor=#efefef |2 ||align=left| ||  ||||bgcolor=#efefef|0 || bgcolor=#efefef|2
|- align=center
|bgcolor=#efefef |1 ||align=left| ||   || || bgcolor=#efefef|1 || bgcolor=#efefef|0
|- align=center
|bgcolor=#efefef |1 ||align=left| ||   || || bgcolor=#efefef|1 || bgcolor=#efefef|0
|- align=center
|bgcolor=#efefef |1 ||align=left| ||  ||||bgcolor=#efefef|1 || bgcolor=#efefef|0
|- align=center
|bgcolor=#efefef |1 ||align=left| ||  ||||bgcolor=#efefef|1 || bgcolor=#efefef|0
|- align=center
|bgcolor=#efefef |1 ||align=left| ||   || || bgcolor=#efefef|1 || bgcolor=#efefef|0
|- align=center
|bgcolor=#efefef |1 ||align=left| ||  ||||bgcolor=#efefef|1 || bgcolor=#efefef|0
|- align=center
|bgcolor=#efefef |1 ||align=left| ||   || || bgcolor=#efefef|1 || bgcolor=#efefef|0
|- align=center
|bgcolor=#efefef |1 ||align=left| ||   || || bgcolor=#efefef|1 || bgcolor=#efefef|0
|- align=center
|bgcolor=#efefef |1 ||align=left| ||   || || bgcolor=#efefef|1 || bgcolor=#efefef|0
|- align=center
|bgcolor=#efefef |1 ||align=left| ||   || || bgcolor=#efefef|1 || bgcolor=#efefef|0
|- align=center
|bgcolor=#efefef |1 ||align=left| ||   || || bgcolor=#efefef|1 || bgcolor=#efefef|0
|- align=center
|bgcolor=#efefef |1 ||align=left| ||  || || bgcolor=#efefef|1 || bgcolor=#efefef|0
|- align=center
|bgcolor=#efefef |1 ||align=left| ||  || || bgcolor=#efefef|1 || bgcolor=#efefef|0
|- align=center
|bgcolor=#efefef |1 ||align=left| ||  || || bgcolor=#efefef|1 || bgcolor=#efefef|0
|- align=center
|bgcolor=#efefef |1 ||align=left| ||  || || bgcolor=#efefef|1 || bgcolor=#efefef|0
|- align=center
|bgcolor=#efefef |1 ||align=left| ||   || || bgcolor=#efefef|1 || bgcolor=#efefef|0
|- align=center
|bgcolor=#efefef |1 ||align=left| ||  || || bgcolor=#efefef|1 || bgcolor=#efefef|0
|- align=center
|bgcolor=#efefef |1 ||align=left| ||  || || bgcolor=#efefef|1 || bgcolor=#efefef|0
|- align=center
|bgcolor=#efefef |1 ||align=left| ||   || || bgcolor=#efefef|1 || bgcolor=#efefef|0
|- align=center
|bgcolor=#efefef |1 ||align=left| ||   || || bgcolor=#efefef|1 || bgcolor=#efefef|0
|- align=center
|bgcolor=#efefef |1 ||align=left| ||   || || bgcolor=#efefef|1 || bgcolor=#efefef|0
|- align=center
|bgcolor=#efefef |1 ||align=left| ||   || || bgcolor=#efefef|1 || bgcolor=#efefef|0
|- align=center
|bgcolor=#efefef |1 ||align=left| ||   || || bgcolor=#efefef|1 || bgcolor=#efefef|0
|- align=center
|bgcolor=#efefef |1 ||align=left| ||   || || bgcolor=#efefef|1 || bgcolor=#efefef|0
|- align=center
|bgcolor=#efefef |1 ||align=left| ||  || || bgcolor=#efefef|1 || bgcolor=#efefef|0
|- align=center
|bgcolor=#efefef |1 ||align=left| ||  || || bgcolor=#efefef|1 || bgcolor=#efefef|0
|- align=center
|bgcolor=#efefef |1 ||align=left| ||  || || bgcolor=#efefef|1 || bgcolor=#efefef|0
|- align=center
|bgcolor=#efefef |1 ||align=left| ||   || || bgcolor=#efefef|1 || bgcolor=#efefef|0
|- align=center
|bgcolor=#efefef |1 ||align=left| ||   || || bgcolor=#efefef|1 || bgcolor=#efefef|0
|- align=center
|bgcolor=#efefef |1 ||align=left| ||   || || bgcolor=#efefef|1 || bgcolor=#efefef|0
|- align=center
|bgcolor=#efefef |1 ||align=left| ||  || || bgcolor=#efefef|1 || bgcolor=#efefef|0
|- align=center
|bgcolor=#efefef |1 ||align=left| ||   || || bgcolor=#efefef|1 || bgcolor=#efefef|0
|- align=center
|bgcolor=#efefef |1 ||align=left| ||   || || bgcolor=#efefef|1 || bgcolor=#efefef|0
|- align=center
|bgcolor=#efefef |1 ||align=left| ||   || || bgcolor=#efefef|1 || bgcolor=#efefef|0
|- align=center
|bgcolor=#efefef |1 ||align=left| ||   || || bgcolor=#efefef|1 || bgcolor=#efefef|0
|- align=center
|bgcolor=#efefef |1 ||align=left| ||  || || bgcolor=#efefef|1 || bgcolor=#efefef|0
|- align=center
|bgcolor=#efefef |1 ||align=left| ||   || || bgcolor=#efefef|1 || bgcolor=#efefef|0
|- align=center
|bgcolor=#efefef |1 ||align=left| ||  || || bgcolor=#efefef|1 || bgcolor=#efefef|0
|- align=center
|bgcolor=#efefef |1 ||align=left| ||   || || bgcolor=#efefef|1 || bgcolor=#efefef|0
|- align=center
|bgcolor=#efefef |1 ||align=left| ||   || || bgcolor=#efefef|1 || bgcolor=#efefef|0
|- align=center
|bgcolor=#efefef |1 ||align=left| ||   || || bgcolor=#efefef|1 || bgcolor=#efefef|0
|- align=center
|bgcolor=#efefef |1 ||align=left| ||   || || bgcolor=#efefef|1 || bgcolor=#efefef|0
|- align=center
|bgcolor=#efefef |1 ||align=left| ||   || || bgcolor=#efefef|1 || bgcolor=#efefef|0
|- align=center
|bgcolor=#efefef |1 ||align=left| ||  || || bgcolor=#efefef|1 || bgcolor=#efefef|0
|- align=center
|bgcolor=#efefef |1 ||align=left| ||   || || bgcolor=#efefef|1 || bgcolor=#efefef|0
|- align=center
|bgcolor=#efefef |1 ||align=left| ||   || || bgcolor=#efefef|1 || bgcolor=#efefef|0
|- align=center
|bgcolor=#efefef |1 ||align=left| ||   || || bgcolor=#efefef|1 || bgcolor=#efefef|0
|- align=center
|bgcolor=#efefef |1 ||align=left| ||  ||||bgcolor=#efefef|0 || bgcolor=#efefef|1
|- align=center
|bgcolor=#efefef |1 ||align=left| ||  ||||bgcolor=#efefef|0 || bgcolor=#efefef|1
|- align=center
|bgcolor=#efefef |1 ||align=left| ||  ||||bgcolor=#efefef|0 || bgcolor=#efefef|1
|- align=center
|bgcolor=#efefef |1 ||align=left| ||  ||||bgcolor=#efefef|0 || bgcolor=#efefef|1
|- align=center
|bgcolor=#efefef |1 ||align=left| ||  ||||bgcolor=#efefef|0 || bgcolor=#efefef|1
|- align=center
|bgcolor=#efefef |1 ||align=left| ||  ||||bgcolor=#efefef|0 || bgcolor=#efefef|1
|- align=center
|bgcolor=#efefef |1 ||align=left| ||  ||||bgcolor=#efefef|0 || bgcolor=#efefef|1
|- align=center
|bgcolor=#efefef |1 ||align=left| ||  ||||bgcolor=#efefef|0 || bgcolor=#efefef|1
|- align=center
|bgcolor=#efefef |1 ||align=left| ||  ||||bgcolor=#efefef|0 || bgcolor=#efefef|1
|- align=center
|bgcolor=#efefef |1 ||align=left| ||  ||||bgcolor=#efefef|0 || bgcolor=#efefef|1
|- align=center
|bgcolor=#efefef |1 ||align=left| ||  ||||bgcolor=#efefef|0 || bgcolor=#efefef|1
|- align=center
|bgcolor=#efefef |1 ||align=left| ||  ||||bgcolor=#efefef|0 || bgcolor=#efefef|1
|- align=center
|bgcolor=#efefef |1 ||align=left| ||  ||||bgcolor=#efefef|0 || bgcolor=#efefef|1
|- align=center
|bgcolor=#efefef |1 ||align=left| ||  ||||bgcolor=#efefef|0 || bgcolor=#efefef|1
|- align=center
|bgcolor=#efefef |1 ||align=left| ||  ||||bgcolor=#efefef|0 || bgcolor=#efefef|1
|- align=center
|bgcolor=#efefef |1 ||align=left| ||  ||||bgcolor=#efefef|0 || bgcolor=#efefef|1
|- align=center
|bgcolor=#efefef |1 ||align=left| ||  ||||bgcolor=#efefef|0 || bgcolor=#efefef|1
|- align=center
|bgcolor=#efefef |1 ||align=left| ||  ||||bgcolor=#efefef|0 || bgcolor=#efefef|1
|- align=center
|bgcolor=#efefef |1 ||align=left| ||  ||||bgcolor=#efefef|0 || bgcolor=#efefef|1
|- align=center
|bgcolor=#efefef |1 ||align=left| ||  ||||bgcolor=#efefef|0 || bgcolor=#efefef|1
|- align=center
|bgcolor=#efefef |1 ||align=left| ||  ||||bgcolor=#efefef|0 || bgcolor=#efefef|1
|- align=center
|bgcolor=#efefef |1 ||align=left| ||  ||||bgcolor=#efefef|0 || bgcolor=#efefef|1
|- align=center
|bgcolor=#efefef |1 ||align=left| ||  ||||bgcolor=#efefef|0 || bgcolor=#efefef|1
|- align=center
|bgcolor=#efefef |1 ||align=left| ||  ||||bgcolor=#efefef|0 || bgcolor=#efefef|1
|- align=center
|bgcolor=#efefef |1 ||align=left| ||  ||||bgcolor=#efefef|0 || bgcolor=#efefef|1
|- align=center
|bgcolor=#efefef |1 ||align=left| ||  ||||bgcolor=#efefef|0 || bgcolor=#efefef|1
|- align=center
|bgcolor=#efefef |1 ||align=left| ||  ||||bgcolor=#efefef|0 || bgcolor=#efefef|1
|- align=center
|bgcolor=#efefef |1 ||align=left| ||  ||||bgcolor=#efefef|0 || bgcolor=#efefef|1
|- align=center
|bgcolor=#efefef |1 ||align=left| ||  ||||bgcolor=#efefef|0 || bgcolor=#efefef|1|- align=center
|bgcolor=#efefef |1 ||align=left| ||  ||||bgcolor=#efefef|0 || bgcolor=#efefef|1
|- align=center
|bgcolor=#efefef |1 ||align=left| ||  ||||bgcolor=#efefef|0 || bgcolor=#efefef|1
|- align=center
|bgcolor=#efefef |1 ||align=left| ||  ||||bgcolor=#efefef|0 || bgcolor=#efefef|1
|- align=center
|bgcolor=#efefef |1 ||align=left| ||  ||||bgcolor=#efefef|0 || bgcolor=#efefef|1
|- align=center
|bgcolor=#efefef |1 ||align=left| ||  ||||bgcolor=#efefef|0 || bgcolor=#efefef|1
|- align=center
|bgcolor=#efefef |1 ||align=left| ||  ||||bgcolor=#efefef|0 || bgcolor=#efefef|1
|- align=center
|bgcolor=#efefef |1 ||align=left| ||  ||||bgcolor=#efefef|0 || bgcolor=#efefef|1
|- align=center
|bgcolor=#efefef |1 ||align=left| ||  ||||bgcolor=#efefef|0 || bgcolor=#efefef|1
|- align=center
|bgcolor=#efefef |1 ||align=left| ||  ||||bgcolor=#efefef|0 || bgcolor=#efefef|1
|- align=center
|bgcolor=#efefef |1 ||align=left| ||  ||||bgcolor=#efefef|0 || bgcolor=#efefef|1
|- align=center
|bgcolor=#efefef |1 ||align=left| ||  ||||bgcolor=#efefef|0 || bgcolor=#efefef|1
|- align=center
|bgcolor=#efefef |1 ||align=left| ||  ||||bgcolor=#efefef|0 || bgcolor=#efefef|'''1
|- align=center
|bgcolor=#efefef |1 ||align=left| ||  ||||bgcolor=#efefef|0 || bgcolor=#efefef|1|- align=center
|bgcolor=#efefef |1 ||align=left| ||  ||||bgcolor=#efefef|0 || bgcolor=#efefef|1|- align=center
|bgcolor=#efefef |1 ||align=left| ||  ||||bgcolor=#efefef|0 || bgcolor=#efefef|1|- align=center
|bgcolor=#efefef |1 ||align=left| ||  ||||bgcolor=#efefef|0 || bgcolor=#efefef|1|- align=center
|bgcolor=#efefef |1 ||align=left| ||  ||||bgcolor=#efefef|0 || bgcolor=#efefef|1|- align=center
|bgcolor=#efefef |1 ||align=left| ||  ||||bgcolor=#efefef|0 || bgcolor=#efefef|1|- align=center
|bgcolor=#efefef |1 ||align=left| ||  ||||bgcolor=#efefef|0 || bgcolor=#efefef|1|- align=center
|bgcolor=#efefef |1 ||align=left| ||  ||||bgcolor=#efefef|0 || bgcolor=#efefef|1|- align=center
|bgcolor=#efefef |1 ||align=left| ||  ||||bgcolor=#efefef|0 || bgcolor=#efefef|1|- align=center
|bgcolor=#efefef |1 ||align=left| ||  ||||bgcolor=#efefef|0 || bgcolor=#efefef|1|- align=center
|bgcolor=#efefef |1 ||align=left| ||  ||||bgcolor=#efefef|0 || bgcolor=#efefef|1|- align=center
|bgcolor=#efefef |1 ||align=left| ||  ||||bgcolor=#efefef|0 || bgcolor=#efefef|1|- align=center
|bgcolor=#efefef |1 ||align=left| ||  ||||bgcolor=#efefef|0 || bgcolor=#efefef|1|- align=center
|bgcolor=#efefef |1 ||align=left| ||  ||||bgcolor=#efefef|0 || bgcolor=#efefef|1|- align=center
|bgcolor=#efefef |1 ||align=left| ||  ||||bgcolor=#efefef|0 || bgcolor=#efefef|1|- align=center
|bgcolor=#efefef |1 ||align=left| ||  ||||bgcolor=#efefef|0 || bgcolor=#efefef|1|- align=center
|bgcolor=#efefef |1 ||align=left| ||  ||||bgcolor=#efefef|0 || bgcolor=#efefef|1|- align=center
|bgcolor=#efefef |1 ||align=left| ||  ||||bgcolor=#efefef|0 || bgcolor=#efefef|1|- align=center
|bgcolor=#efefef |1 ||align=left| ||  ||||bgcolor=#efefef|0 || bgcolor=#efefef|1|- align=center
|bgcolor=#efefef |1 ||align=left| ||  ||||bgcolor=#efefef|0 || bgcolor=#efefef|1|- align=center
|bgcolor=#efefef |1 ||align=left| ||  ||||bgcolor=#efefef|0 || bgcolor=#efefef|1|- align=center
|bgcolor=#efefef |1 ||align=left| ||  ||||bgcolor=#efefef|0 || bgcolor=#efefef|1|- align=center
|bgcolor=#efefef |1 ||align=left| ||  ||||bgcolor=#efefef|0 || bgcolor=#efefef|1|- align=center
|bgcolor=#efefef |1 ||align=left| ||  ||||bgcolor=#efefef|0 || bgcolor=#efefef|1|- align=center
|bgcolor=#efefef |1 ||align=left| ||  ||||bgcolor=#efefef|0 || bgcolor=#efefef|1|- align=center
|bgcolor=#efefef |1 ||align=left| ||  ||||bgcolor=#efefef|0 || bgcolor=#efefef|1|- align=center
|bgcolor=#efefef |1 ||align=left| ||  ||||bgcolor=#efefef|0 || bgcolor=#efefef|1|- align=center
|bgcolor=#efefef |1 ||align=left| ||  ||||bgcolor=#efefef|0 || bgcolor=#efefef|1|- align=center
|bgcolor=#efefef |1 ||align=left| ||  ||||bgcolor=#efefef|0 || bgcolor=#efefef|1|- align=center
|bgcolor=#efefef |1 ||align=left| ||  ||||bgcolor=#efefef|0 || bgcolor=#efefef|1|- align=center
|bgcolor=#efefef |1 ||align=left| ||  ||||bgcolor=#efefef|0 || bgcolor=#efefef|1|- align=center
|bgcolor=#efefef |1 ||align=left| ||  ||||bgcolor=#efefef|0 || bgcolor=#efefef|1|- align=center
|bgcolor=#efefef |1 ||align=left| ||  ||||bgcolor=#efefef|0 || bgcolor=#efefef|1|- align=center
|bgcolor=#efefef |1 ||align=left| ||  ||||bgcolor=#efefef|0 || bgcolor=#efefef|1|- align=center
|bgcolor=#efefef |1 ||align=left| ||  ||||bgcolor=#efefef|0 || bgcolor=#efefef|1|- align=center
|bgcolor=#efefef |1 ||align=left| ||  ||||bgcolor=#efefef|0 || bgcolor=#efefef|1|- align=center
|bgcolor=#efefef |1 ||align=left| ||  ||||bgcolor=#efefef|0 || bgcolor=#efefef|1|- align=center
|bgcolor=#efefef |1 ||align=left| ||  ||||bgcolor=#efefef|0 || bgcolor=#efefef|1|- align=center
|bgcolor=#efefef |1 ||align=left| ||  ||||bgcolor=#efefef|0 || bgcolor=#efefef|1|- align=center
|bgcolor=#efefef |1 ||align=left| ||  ||||bgcolor=#efefef|0 || bgcolor=#efefef|1|- align=center
|bgcolor=#efefef |1 ||align=left| ||  ||||bgcolor=#efefef|0 || bgcolor=#efefef|1|- align=center
|bgcolor=#efefef |1 ||align=left| ||  ||||bgcolor=#efefef|0 || bgcolor=#efefef|1|- align=center
|bgcolor=#efefef |1 ||align=left| ||  ||||bgcolor=#efefef|0 || bgcolor=#efefef|1|- align=center
|bgcolor=#efefef |1 ||align=left| ||  ||||bgcolor=#efefef|0 || bgcolor=#efefef|1'|}

 Titles won by nation 

 Aljaž Bedene started representing Great Britain in March, he won one title whilst representing Slovenia.

 Point distribution Points are awarded as follows:''

References

External links 
 Official website
 spvie mutuelle avis

 
ATP Challenger Tour seasons
ATP Challenger Tour